Tom Turk and Daffy is a 1944 Warner Bros. Looney Tunes cartoon directed by Chuck Jones. The cartoon was released on February 12, 1944, and stars Porky Pig and Daffy Duck. Michael Maltese and Tedd Pierce are both the writers of the short, and are credited here as "The Staff".

The voices of Daffy and Porky were provided by Mel Blanc, while Tom Turk was voiced by Billy Bletcher.

Plot
On a cold snowy day, Daffy Duck is making a snowman until he hears gunfire in the distance. A turkey, named Tom Turk, desperately begs Daffy to hide him from Porky Pig, who here is portrayed as a pilgrim hunting for a turkey for a turkey dinner. Daffy agrees and hides Tom in the snowman he made and proclaims to Porky that he won't tell him where his turkey went, as locks appear on his beak. Inside the snowman, Tom Turk mutters, "What a pal, what a pal, what a pal, what a pal, what a pal. What a pal". However, Daffy eventually gives in after Porky mentions all the food he would've prepared for dinner, including candied yams, standing on a stool marked "stool pigeon", rushing the snowman with Tom inside in front of Porky, and putting up hundreds of signs pointing to it. Inside the snowman, Tom Turk mutters, "Quisling".

Tom Turk, betrayed by Daffy's perfidious attitude, digs under the snowman and plucks his back feathers onto Daffy, who was breaking down for being a stool pigeon to him. Porky then mistakes Daffy as the turkey he was hunting, which Daffy denies ("Turkey? Who's a turkey? Now wait a minute, Myles Standish. I'm a duck. Quack, quack, quack! I can swim. Observe."), and Porky proceeds to chase him across the snowy landscape, with Daffy rolling down each hill in a giant snowball. Daffy hides, then deliberately pelts Porky with snowballs offscreen, then wallops him on the head with a mallet in a giant flying snowball. He gets some water out of a frozen lake and throws it at Porky. The water freezes into a bucket-shaped piece of ice as it flies at Porky, hitting him. Daffy remarks, "Cool as a cucumber". Porky wakes up, and chases him. Daffy deliberately throws water on himself, freezing for protection. Porky hits him with his gun, breaking the ice in half, only to vibrate. Daffy uses water from a river to make an ice bridge, and, disguised as a toll collector, tricks Porky into paying the 10¢ toll. Porky crosses the ice bridge, only to realize that Daffy made a dunce, a dope, and a sucker out of him when he envisions himself first wearing a dunce cap, then as a bottle of dope, and finally a sucker. This makes him angry, and then he starts running in place, angrily smiling, kicking snow back as he has finally lost his sanity, and then runs at Daffy. Daffy, realizing he's angered Porky, runs as Porky angrily chases him, on the warpath against him, charging through a rock and snow, running out of a pile of snow as a snow tank. Daffy ditches him in a snow bank, then runs back to Tom, who was building another snowman. Daffy meets up with him again, and begs Tom to help him hide from Porky. Tom agrees, and "attempts" to hide Daffy in different places, but finds all of them fruitless. The cartoon ends with Tom continuously "hiding" Daffy in different places into the night.

Cast
Mel Blanc as Daffy Duck, Porky Pig
Billy Bletcher as Tom Turk (uncredited)

Home media
 VHS - Cartoon Moviestars: Porky Pig and Friends
 LaserDisc - The Golden Age of Looney Tunes
 DVD - Looney Tunes Super Stars' Porky & Friends: Hilarious Ham

See also
 Looney Tunes and Merrie Melodies filmography (1940–49)
 List of Daffy Duck cartoons
 Porky Pig filmography
 Jerky Turkey

References

External links

 

1944 films
1944 animated films
Looney Tunes shorts
Warner Bros. Cartoons animated short films
Short films directed by Chuck Jones
Daffy Duck films
Porky Pig films
Films scored by Carl Stalling
Thanksgiving in films
Vitaphone short films
Films produced by Leon Schlesinger
1940s Warner Bros. animated short films
Films with screenplays by Michael Maltese
1940s English-language films